Fañch Broudig or François Broudic (born 1946 in Buhulien) is a Breton journalist and Breton- and French-language writer.

From 1964 to 2007, he broadcast in Breton on the France 3 Bretagne radio station, then from 1971 on television as well.

He is president of the cultural foundation Emgleo Breiz, which promotes the Breton language and its teaching.

Publications
 Roll al leoriou hag ar pennadou bet embannet e brezoneg e 1973 = Bibliographie des publications en langue bretonne. Année 1973. In: Studi, n°1, Kerzu/Décembre 1974
 Roll al leoriou hag ar pennadou bet embannet e brezoneg e 1974 = Bibliographie des publications en langue bretonne. Année 1974. In: Studi, n°5, Ebrel/Avril 1976
 Roll al leoriou hag ar pennadou bet embannet e brezoneg e 1975 = Bibliographie des publications en langue bretonne. Année 1975. In: Studi, n°10, Genver/Janvier 1979
 Ar bed o trei. Eun dibab a skridou a-vremañ evid ar skoliou brezoneg. Brest: Ar Helenner, 1983.
 Langue et littérature bretonne. Dix ans de bibliographie. 1973-1982. Brest: Brud Nevez, 1984.
 Taolennou ar baradoz, Le Chasse-Marée / Ed. de l'Estran, Douarnenez, 1988, 
 Evolution de la pratique du breton de la fin de l'Ancien Régime à nos jours, thesis, University of Western Brittany, Brest, 1993
 Roparz, Jakez hag o diskibien, Ar Skol Vrezoneg, Brest, 1993, 
 La pratique du breton de l'Ancien Régime à nos jours, Presses Universitaires Rennes II, 1995, 
 L'interdiction du breton en 1902. La IIIe République contre les langues régionales Coop Breizh, Spézet, 1996, 
 À la recherche de la frontière. La limite linguistique entre Haute et Basse-Bretagne aux XIXe et XXe siècles, Ar skol vrezoneg, Brest, 1997, 
 Combes a-eneb ar brezoneg, Brud Nevez, Brest, 1998, 
 Histoire de la langue bretonne, Editions of Ouest-France, Rennes, 1999,

See also
List of Celtic-language media

External links 
 Personal website
  Interview with Fañch Broudig

1946 births
Living people
Writers from Brittany
20th-century French non-fiction writers
20th-century French journalists
People from Lannion
20th-century French male writers
French male non-fiction writers